Luxco, Inc. is a privately owned producer and marketer of distilled beverages and liqueurs. Formerly called the David Sherman Corporation, the company was renamed in 2006. Founded in 1958 in St. Louis, Missouri, by David Sherman Sr. and Paul A. Lux, the company sells beverages across the United States with some international trade.  In January 2021, MGP Ingredients announced a planned purchase of Luxco.

Brands 
Some brands of Luxco are:
 Arrow liqueurs
 Caffé Lolita liqueur
 Lady Bligh spiced rum
 El Mayor tequila
 Everclear
 Juarez tequila
 Purple Passion
 Saint Brendan's Irish Cream Liqueur
 Salvador's cocktails
 Yago Sant'gria, a sangria.  
 Vodkas:
 Pearl vodka, a five times distilled vodka which comes in a variety of flavors
 Tvarscki 
 Whiskey:
Ezra Brooks (and Old Ezra 101)
 Rebel Yell
 Blood Oath
Yellowstone, as distributor for Limestone Branch Distillery

Luxco once owned the Admiral Nelson Spiced Rum brand, but it was sold in late 2011.

At the end of 2011, Luxco agreed to acquire all of the outstanding stock of Paramount Distillers Incorporated of Cleveland, Ohio and its Meier’s Wine Cellars subsidiary in Cincinnati, Ohio. In 2011, the Company had $220 million in sales and about 180 employees. In January 2013, Luxco  bought Beam's Wolfschmidt, Dark Eyes, Calvert, Bellows, Canada House and Tempo brands for $65 million.

Manufacturing, packaging, marketing and distribution take place at the company facilities in St. Louis, Missouri.

References

External links
Luxco website

Companies based in St. Louis
Food and drink companies established in 1958
Distilleries in Missouri
1958 establishments in Missouri
Food and drink companies based in Missouri